Baby Come Home may refer to:

 "Baby Come Home" (Bush song), 2012
 "Baby Come Home" (Scissor Sisters song), 2012

See also 
 "Baby Come On Home", a 1993 Led Zeppelin song